Herndon is an unincorporated community in Wyoming County, West Virginia, United States.
It has a population of 566 as of 2010.

References

Unincorporated communities in Wyoming County, West Virginia
Coal towns in West Virginia